Bueng Khong Long is a sub-district (tambon) in Bueng Khong Long district in Bueng Kan province, northeastern Thailand. As of 2010, it had a population of 10,245 people, with jurisdiction over 17 villages.

Both the district and sub-district are named after a reservoir south of Bueng Khong Long town which is a breeding ground for aquatic birds and spawning ground for fish.

References

Tambon of Bueng Kan province
Populated places in Bueng Kan province
Bueng Khong Long District